Portgower  is a former fishing village on the east coast of Scotland in Helmsdale, Sutherland, Scottish Highlands and is in the Scottish council area of Highland.

References

Populated places in Sutherland